Edgard Amping (born 9 June 2003) is an Indonesian professional footballer who plays as a left-back for Liga 1 club PSM Makassar and the Indonesia national under-20 team.

Club career

Early career
Amping is a young player born in Mamuju, West Sulawesi, June 9, 2003. He playing as a left back. Amping started his career at SSB Mitra Manakarra at the age of 11. Together with SSB Mitra Manakarra, he appeared in the 2016 Danone Nations Cup national round in Jakarta.

PSM Makassar
He was recruited by PSM Makassar U16 in early January 2018. At that time, he was 15 years old. A year later, Amping was promoted to the PSM Makassar U18 team. Together with his squad, his performances continued to be honed and began to get the attention of many coaches. His potential continues to grow after successfully passing the second volume of the Garuda Select program selection in 2019. He received guidance from Des Walker and Dennis Wise. When participating in the second volume of the Garuda Select program, Amping was recorded as the player who played the highest number of matches and playing minutes. His performances during that time made Amping one of the three players who returned to training with the third edition of the Garuda Select program.

Muba Babel United (loan)
In October 2021, Amping signed a contract with Liga 2 club Muba Babel United on loan from PSM Makassar. Amping made his league debut in a 2–0 lost against PSMS Medan on 11 October as a substitute for Derry Herlangga in the 37th minute. On 15 October, Amping scored his first goal for Muba Babel United against KS Tiga Naga in the 41st minute at the Gelora Sriwijaya Stadium, Palembang.

International career
On 30 May 2022, Edgard made his debut for an Indonesian youth team against a Venezuela U-20 squad in the 2022 Maurice Revello Tournament in France.

Career statistics

Club

References

External links
 Edgard Amping at Liga Indonesia

Living people
2003 births
Indonesian footballers
Association football fullbacks
Indonesia youth international footballers
Liga 1 (Indonesia) players
Liga 2 (Indonesia) players
PSM Makassar players
Muba Babel United F.C. players
Sportspeople from West Sulawesi